Guapas is an Argentine telenovela created by Adrián Suar and produced by Pol-ka

Schedule

It was shown on Canal 13 from March 17, 2014 until January 9, 2015 at 11:00 p.m. On April 28, 2015 it moved ahead to 10:00 pm, and on August 11, it changed schedule again and began broadcasting from 9:00 p.m. Several weeks it moved to 9:15 p.m.

Plot 
In the story, Mónica (Mercedes Morán), María Emilia (Carla Peterson), Lorena (Florencia Bertotti), Laura (Isabel Macedo) and Andrea (Araceli González) they know each other when the bank in which they had their finances suddenly closes and keeps the money from all the deposits. So, from one day to the next, the dreams and projects of each are truncated. Seven years after that fateful day of 2007, the five have become very friendly, but they have not yet been able to recover from that loss and eagerly seek economic and emotional order. It will take a new and unexpected path in their lives so they can reflect deeply on their personal stories. Something like a second chance. The last to fall in love, perform, build a family, follow the vocation, heal wounds or simply overcome fears, those that paralyze and do not allow progress. After all, they are not perfect, they are guapas.

Production
All five protagonists are famous Argentinian actresses and most of them had worked together at previous telenovelas. Although they are not personal friends, they commented that they have no problems working together, and do not foresee any internal problems like those suffered by Farsantes. Farsantes, the previous telenovela, had fights between the actors that led many of them to leave it before its conclusion. The actress Mercedes Morán is the mother of the actress Mercedes Scápola, and their characters are mother and daughter in the plot as well. Morán had encouraged her daughter to have her own acting career, and made a cameo with her in the 2012 telenovela Graduados. Both of them felt that Guapas was the appropriate time for a steady joint work. Morán's character and that played by Dady Brieva are a couple; both actors had been lead actors in a previous telenovela, Gasoleros.

Actress Araceli González returned to Pol-ka for this production. She was the lead actress of Carola Casini, one of the first telenovelas by Pol-ka. She was married with Adrián Suar, president of Pol-ka, by then; they divorced and now both of them are married with other people. González commented that she had known the company when it was just a medium enterprise, and that she has several relatives working in it.

Reception
The telenovela's main competitor is Sres. Papis, a telenovela aired by Telefe, with a mainly male cast. On the first day it was aired, Guapas got 16.3 rating points, against 12 points for Sres. Papis.

Cast 
 Mercedes Morán as Mónica Duarte
 Carla Peterson as María Emilia "Mey" García del Río
 Florencia Bertotti as Lorena Patricia Giménez
 Araceli González as Andrea Luna
 Isabel Macedo as Laura Luna
 Esteban Lamothe as Pablo González
 Mike Amigorena as Federico Müller
 Muriel Santa Ana as Reina Suárez
 Vivian El Jaber as Débora Spritz
 Fabiana Cantilo as Alejandra Rey
 Alfredo Casero as Oscar Falcón
 Adrián Suar as Javier "Facha" Salvatierra 
 Mercedes Scápola as Natalia Diez
 Julieta Zylberberg as Sol Rodríguez Alcorta
 Carlos Belloso as Carlos Braverman
 Nicolás Repetto as Leonardo Zavala
 Alberto Fernández de Rosa as Coco Luna
 Carlos Mena as Dr. Müller
 Ignacio Huang as Ricardo
 Marilú Marini as Amalia
 Rafael Spregelburd as Mariano
 Thelma Fardin as Catalina's friend
 Rafael Ferro as Francisco Laprida
 Mauricio Dayub as Alejandro Rey
 Alberto Ajaka as Rubén D'Onofrio
 Dady Brieva as Mario "Tano" Manfredi
 Inés Estévez as Silvia Torrese
 Natalie Pérez as Cinthia Miguens
 Dan Breitman as Ignacio Lynch
 Andrea Bonelli as Federica Goldman
 Franco Bruzzone as Mateo Manfredi
 Gaby Ferrero as Norma Patricia Pérez Vda. de Giménez
 Sofía González Gil as Catalina Rey
 Gerardo Otero as Juan Cardales
 Javier De Nevares as José Pablo García del Río
 Dalma Maradona as Verónica "Lavalle" Cuello
 Federico Olivera as Ernesto
 Dalia Elnecave as Blanca
 Valeria Lois as Claudia
 Paula Kohan as Flavia
 Paloma Contreras as Ivana
 Melania Lenoir as Marina
 Iair Said as Roly

Awards and nominations

References

External links

 Official site 
 
 Production site

Golden Martín Fierro Award winners
2014 telenovelas
Pol-ka telenovelas
2014 Argentine television series debuts
2015 Argentine television series endings